A gyōji is a referee in professional sumo wrestling in Japan.

Gyōji usually enter the sumo world as teenagers and remain employees of the Sumo Association until they retire aged 65.  There are currently a little over 40 active gyōji with an average of one in each sumo stable, though some stables have more than one and some have no gyōji.

History
Originally there were no official referees in sumo: if there were any close matches the emperor would determine the winner. It was not until the early 16th century, with the help of Oda Nobunaga, that gyōji started to make an appearance.

Responsibilities
The gyōji's principal and most obvious task is to referee bouts between two sumo wrestlers. After the yobidashi has called them into the ring, the gyōji will also call out each wrestler's name. It is the gyōjis responsibility to watch over the wrestlers as they go through the initial prebout staring contests, and then coordinate the initial charge (or tachi-ai) between the wrestlers. After he has been signaled by the shinpan (ringside judge) time keeper, the gyōji will indicate that the preparation time (four minutes for the top division) is up by saying "jikan desu, te wo tsuite" or "jikan desu, te wo oroshite"  ("it's time, put hands down") and signal with his gunbai that the bout is to begin. He may add, "kamaete mattanashi." ("prepare, no waiting.") Immediately after the wrestlers initiate a tachi-ai that the gyōji deems acceptable, he  will shout hakki-yoi (lit. "Put some spirit into it.") Although it is the wrestlers who ultimately determine the exact point at which the tachi-ai is initiated, if the two wrestlers' breathing is not synchronized or if one wrestler charges before they both put their hands down, the gyōji will shout "Madamada" ("Not yet!"), while raising his hand between the two wrestlers. This is referred to as a matta or a false start, and only the gyōji can call this. If the gyōji does not call a matta, a wrestler must fight, even if he was not ready. Once a matta has been ruled, the wrestlers must return to their starting positions and try another tachi-ai.

During the bout, the gyōji should keep the wrestlers informed that the bout is still live (it is possible for a wrestler to brush his foot outside the ring without realizing it).  He does this by shouting "nokotta nokotta!" (残った、残った！), which roughly means: "still in, still in!" The gyōji also has the responsibility to encourage the wrestlers to fight when action between them has completely stopped: for instance, when both of them are locked up on each other's mawashi in the middle of the ring. To do this, he uses a phrase similar to that which marked the beginning of the bout: "oi hakkeyoi, oi!" (発気揚々!). If the match time exceeds four minutes with little movement, the time-keeper will usually indicate to the gyōji to call for a mizu-iri, or water break. The gyōji will then record the exact positions of both wrestlers' hands and feet, and put them back in this position once the break has concluded. Additionally, the gyōji may call for a short break if he needs to fix a wrestler's mawashi. Mid-match breaks are rare, but do happen. When a wrestler has apparently fallen to the clay, the gyōji is expected to determine the winner of the bout. His most obvious accessory is a solid wooden war-fan, called a gunbai, which he uses in the prebout ritual and in pointing to the winner's side at the end of each bout, and will often shout "Shobu-ari" ("There is a result").

The gyōji's decision as to the winner of the bout is not immediately final and can be called into question by one of the five shinpan (judges) who sit around the ring. If they dispute the result, they hold a mono-ii (lit: a talk about things) in the center of the ring, and correspond through an earpiece to a further two judges in the video review room. They can confirm the decision of the gyōji (gunbai-dōri or "way of the gunbai"), overturn it (sashi-chigae or "wrong/different indication"), or order a rematch (torinaoshi). The gyōji is not expected to take part in the discussion during a mono-ii unless asked to do so. In many cases, a match may be too close to call, or the gyōji may not have managed to get a clear view of the end of the bout. Regardless, he is still obliged to make a split second decision as to his choice of "winner". This creates pressure on the gyōji, especially considering that a reversed decision (sashi-chigae) is like a black mark. Every time a gyōji's call is overturned they must submit a written report about the ruling to the Japanese Sumo Association. Too many overturned calls and it may affect a gyōji's future career (such referees are never demoted; rather they are simply passed over for promotion). The top two gyōji (tategyōji) carry a tantō (dagger) to symbolize their willingness to commit seppuku if they have their call overturned. Instead of actually committing seppuku they will submit letters of resignation. Most letters of resignation are not accepted, though there have been instances where they have been; instead the gyōji may be suspended for a number of days.

In addition to refereeing matches, gyōji have a number of other responsibilities. Before a tournament begins one of the top gyoji tategyoji and two other gyōji acting as Shinto priests will perform the dohyō matsuri (lit. ring festival) where they will consecrate and purify the ring. They also officially lead the ring entering ceremonies.  During a tournament they announce the following day's matches. They are also responsible for keeping the records of wrestlers' results, and determining the technique used by a particular wrestler in winning a bout. At the end of the tournament one gyōji will stand in the center of the ring and will be tossed into the air by lower-ranked wrestlers as a way of sending off the kami (deities). The gyōji also serve as moderators for ranking and match-combination conferences. Before a tournament they draw up an ornate ranking list called a banzuke written in a special calligraphic style called negishi-ryu. It can take a gyōji up to 10 years to qualify to write the banzuke, and it can take up to three different gyōji three days to finish writing the ita banzuke, which is much larger and rests outside the stadium. The Ita banzuke were used as a promotional billboard during the Edo Period. All gyōji are also associated with one of the sumo training stables throughout their career and have many individual duties in assisting their stablemaster, such as performing clerical work. Additionally, the tategyōji both serve on the deliberation council which is the governing council of the Japanese Sumō Association.

Ranking

Career progression is based on a ranking system similar in name to that used for sumo wrestlers (see sumo). The rank nominally represents the rank of wrestler that they are qualified to referee for. The biggest factor in determining promotion of a gyōji is seniority. However, this is not always the sole factor; others include accuracy in refereeing, good voice projection, leadership qualities, calligraphy skill, speed, and agility. These are the skills at the heart of the profession and they are passed down by senior gyōji to junior gyōji. While gyōji are not demoted, they may be passed over for promotion if they have had too many of their calls reversed.Ranks in decreasing order tate-gyōji (chief gyōji)
 san'yaku-gyōji
 makuuchi-gyōji
 jūryō-gyōji
 makushita-gyōji
 sandanme-gyōji
 jonidan-gyōji
 jonokuchi-gyōji

Top gyōji (makuuchi and above) are assigned tsukebito, or personal attendants in their stable, just as top wrestlers (sekitori) are. These may be junior referees or lower-ranked wrestlers. There is a superstition in the sumo world that a wrestler serving a gyōji will not go on to have a successful career.

Gyōji normally join around the age of 19. They are then given a three-year apprenticeship, though they may be promoted during that time. On average it takes a gyōji 15 years to be promoted to officiating juryo matches. It takes another 15 years to be promoted to officiating makuuchi matches. The tategyōji (top two gyōji) usually have anywhere from 40 to 50 years of experience.

Uniform

When refereeing matches senior gyōji wear elaborate silk outfits, based on Japanese clothing from the Heian and Ashikaga periods, with influences from the Edo period.

Like the sumo wrestlers, gyōji ranked at makushita level and below wear a much simpler outfit than those ranked above them. It is made of cotton rather than silk and is about knee length. The outfit also incorporates a number of rosettes (kikutoji), and tassels (fusa) which are normally green, but can be black in colour. Within the dohyō (ring) they are also expected to go barefoot.

On promotion to the lowest senior rank of jūryō the gyōji will change into the more elaborate full length silk outfit. The kikutoji and fusa on his outfit will also change to green and white. He is also entitled to wear tabi on his feet.

As he moves further up the ranks there are additional small changes:

Makuuchi ranked gyōji merely need to change the colour of the kikutoji and fusa to red and white.

On achievement of san'yaku rank the rosettes and tassels become solid red and he also is allowed to wear straw zōri sandals on his feet in addition to the tabi. In addition, this rank and tate-gyōji of the highest rank hang inro from their right waist.

As described above, the two holders of the topmost rank, equivalent to yokozuna and ōzeki, are the tate-gyōji. The kikutoji and fusa are purple and white for the lower-ranked tate-gyōji (Shikimori Inosuke) and solid purple for the higher-ranked one (Kimura Shonosuke). Furthermore, both the top two gyōji carry a tantō (a dagger) visible in the belt of the outfit. This is supposed to represent the seriousness of the decisions they must make in determining the outcome of a bout, and their preparedness to commit seppuku if they make a mistake. In reality if one of the two top-ranked gyōji has his decision as to the victor of a bout overturned by the judges then he is expected to tender his resignation instead. However, the resignation is generally rejected by the Chairman of the Japan Sumo Association.  A tate-gyōji'''s submission of his resignation can usually be regarded as simply a gesture of apology from one of the highest-ranked referees for his mistake. There have, however, been rare cases when the resignation has been accepted, or  the gyōji concerned has been suspended from duty for a short period.

Ring names

As with virtually all positions in the Sumo Association, including the wrestlers and the oyakata, the gyōji take on a professional name, which can change as they are promoted. From around the 16th century and until the end of the Edo period these professional names were taken from a number of influential noble families associated with sumo, such as Kimura, Shikimori, Yoshida, Iwai, Kise and Nagase. Gyōji associated with these families derived their professional names from them. Over time however, noble families' influence on sumo waned until eventually only two "family" professional names remained, Kimura and Shikimori, with the titles having lost their connection with the families to which they were originally tied. The Kimura and Shikimori families date as far back as the early 18th century.

In modern times, all gyōji will take either the family name Kimura or Shikimori as their professional name, depending on the tradition of the stable that they join. There are exceptions to this naming convention, but they are rare. The professional name Kimura outnumbers the name Shikimori by about 3 to 1. Additionally there are different styles for how a gyōji will hold his gunbai depending on which family he is in. The Kimura family hold their gunbai with their palm and figures face down, while the Shikimori will hold theirs with their palm and figures face up. The Kimura family is also seen as slightly more prestigious than the Shikimori family. Gyōji will at first use their own given name as their personal/second name which follows Kimura or Shikimori. Later, as they rise through the ranks and begin officiating higher divisions, one of the two family names and a personal name together as a set title is passed down. This will either be passed down from a senior gyōji (often a mentor) or the junior gyōji will receive one of a number of established gyōji professional names that is currently unused. This naming convention can be seen when looking at a list of gyōji such as on a banzuke, where younger, lower-ranked gyōji have modern-sounding personal/second names, while higher ranked ones have antiquated-sounding second names that have been passed down for generations. It is also not uncommon for gyōji to switch between families as they are promoted through the ranks. Rising through the ranks is based largely on seniority, but the accuracy of an individual gyōjis decisions and his bearing on the dohyō are also determining factors.

At the top of the gyōji hierarchy are two fixed positions called tate-gyōji who always take the names Kimura Shōnosuke and Shikimori Inosuke, the senior- and junior-ranked tate-gyōji respectively. They officiate over only the top few bouts in san'yaku, near the end of a tournament day. Both of these professional names have the longest history and they have been passed down through the most generations of gyōji. It is normally the practice that when the higher-ranking Kimura Shōnosuke retires at 65, he is succeeded by the second ranking Shikimori Inosuke after a certain interval.

Latest tate-gyōji
As of the January 2019 basho there is one active tate-gyōji. The most recent holders of the two tate-gyōji names are:
37th Kimura Shōnosuke, real name: Saburō Hatakeyama, member of Tomozuna stable, November 2013 to March 2015 (his retirement). 
41st Shikimori Inosuke, real name: Hideki Imaoka, member of Takadagawa stable, since January 2019.

Latest san'yaku-gyōji

As of the January 2019 basho there are four san'yaku-gyōji'':
6th Kimura Tamajirō, real name: Masashi Takeda, member of Tatsunami stable, since January 2014
3rd Kimura Yōdō, real name: Yuji Horasawa, member of Kokonoe stable, since November 2014
15th Kimura Shōtarō, real name: Yoshimitsu Morita, member of Kasugano stable, since May 2015
Kimura Kōnosuke, real name: Toshiaki Kojima, member of Kokonoe stable, since January 2019

Controversy
In January 2018, the 40th Shikimori Inosuke (Itsuo Nouchi) was suspended for three tournaments for sexually harassing a junior referee. The Japan Sumo Association accepted his resignation in May 2018 when the suspension concluded.

See also
Glossary of sumo terms
List of sumo stables
List of years in sumo

References

External links

List of current gyōji at the Japan Sumo Association site

Japanese words and phrases
Sumo people
Referees and umpires
Sumo terminology